Vice Admiral Charles Rodney Style,  (born 15 January 1954) is a former Royal Navy officer who served as Commandant of the Royal College of Defence Studies from 2008 to 2012.

Naval career
Educated at the University of Cambridge, Style joined the Royal Navy in 1974. He was appointed Equipment Capability Manager for Precision Attack in 2002, Commander United Kingdom Maritime Forces in 2004 and Deputy Chief of the Defence Staff (Commitments) in 2006. In 2007 he had to deal with the detention of fifteen Royal Navy personnel by Iranian Revolutionary Guards. He became Commandant of the Royal College of Defence Studies in 2008.

References

|-

|-

1954 births
Alumni of the University of Cambridge
Commanders of the Order of the British Empire
Living people
Royal Navy vice admirals
Royal Navy personnel of the War in Afghanistan (2001–2021)